Oakland Harbor Light is a former lighthouse, now a restaurant in Embarcadero Cove, California.

History
The original tower was built in 1890 at the entrance of Oakland Harbor. The wooden pilings on which the structure sat had deteriorated by 1902, and a larger replacement lighthouse was constructed on concrete pilings nearby, which began operation in 1903. The original structure was then sold and removed. In 1966, the lighthouse was replaced by an automated beacon and deactivated. It was eventually sold to a private party and relocated to Embarcadero Cove in Oakland, where it opened in 1984 as Quinn's Lighthouse Restaurant. The lantern room was removed after deactivation in 1966, and was transferred to Mark Abbott Memorial Lighthouse in Santa Cruz, California, where it continued to deteriorate and was replaced in 1996.

See also

 List of lighthouses in the United States

References

External links
 United States Coast Guard 
 Inventory of Historic Light Stations California Lighthouses
 Oakland Harbor Light 
 Quinn's Lighthouse Restaurant

Lighthouses in the San Francisco Bay Area
San Francisco Bay
Buildings and structures in Oakland, California
Lighthouses completed in 1890
1890 establishments in California
19th century in Oakland, California
Lighthouses completed in 1903
Transportation buildings and structures in Alameda County, California